Félix Émile Marcotte (12 June 1865 – 26 July 1953) was an American-born French sailor who represented his country at the 1900 Summer Olympics in Meulan, France. With Jacques Baudrier as helmsman and fellow crewmember William Martin, Jules Valton and Jean Le Bret Marcotte took the 2nd place in first race of the .5 to 1 ton and finished 3rd in the second race.

Further reading

References

External links

1865 births
1953 deaths
French male sailors (sport)
Olympic sailors of France
Sailors at the 1900 Summer Olympics – .5 to 1 ton
Medalists at the 1900 Summer Olympics
Olympic silver medalists for France
Olympic bronze medalists for France
Olympic medalists in sailing
Sailors at the 1900 Summer Olympics – Open class
French people of American descent
Sportspeople from New York City